Union Cemetery is a cemetery located near Stepney Road in Easton, Connecticut. The site dates back to the 1700s. According to ghost hunters, it is one of the "most haunted" cemeteries in the entire United States. Connecticut demonologists Ed and Lorraine Warren have written a book about the cemetery entitled Graveyard.

Reported hauntings

According to popular legends, the "White Lady" ghost haunts Union cemetery as well as Stepney Cemetery in Monroe.  Like other White Lady ghost stories, Union Cemetery's ghost is described as wearing a white "diaphanous white nightgown or a wedding dress".  Demonologist Ed Warren claimed to have seen the ghost and to have video of it.

See also
List of reportedly haunted locations in the United States

References

Easton, Connecticut
Reportedly haunted locations in Connecticut
History of Connecticut
Cemeteries in Fairfield County, Connecticut
Buildings and structures in Easton, Connecticut